Jorge Alberto de la Rosa Gonzalez (born April 5, 1981) is a Mexican former professional baseball pitcher. He played in Major League Baseball (MLB) for the Milwaukee Brewers, Kansas City Royals, Colorado Rockies, Arizona Diamondbacks and Chicago Cubs.

Professional career

Minor leagues
De la Rosa was signed as an amateur free agent by the Arizona Diamondbacks in 1998.  He was purchased by the Monterrey Sultanes of the Mexican League prior to the 2000 season.  The Boston Red Sox purchased de la Rosa from Monterrey prior to the 2001 season.

In November 2003 season, the Red Sox traded de la Rosa with Casey Fossum, Brandon Lyon and Michael Goss to the Diamondbacks for Curt Schilling.  The Diamondbacks traded him in December 2003 with Chris Capuano, Craig Counsell, Chad Moeller, Lyle Overbay and Junior Spivey to the Milwaukee Brewers for Richie Sexson, Shane Nance and a player to be named later.

Milwaukee Brewers
De la Rosa made his MLB debut on August 14, 2004, for the Milwaukee Brewers.

In 2005, De la Rosa split between the minors and the Brewers bullpen, appearing in 38 games, with a record of 2–2.

During the  season, Brewers starting pitchers Ben Sheets, Tomo Ohka, and long relief man Rick Helling were injured, leaving the fifth spot open. The Brewers inserted De la Rosa in the starting role after an unsuccessful stint with Dana Eveland. In 3 starts, he went 0–2 with a 12.27 ERA. In his third start, he was removed because of blisters on his finger. He was then placed on the 15-day disabled list. In 18 games, his ERA was 8.60 with 30 runs allowed and 22 walks in 30 innings.

Kansas City Royals
De la Rosa was traded to the Kansas City Royals for Tony Graffanino during the 2006 season. In his first start for the Kansas City Royals, he pitched six innings allowing two earned runs and getting the win. De la Rosa remained in the rotation, finishing the season with a 3–4 record in 10 starts for the Royals.

De la Rosa's 2007 season marked his first full season in the major leagues, pitching in 23 starts for the Royals. His record was 8–12 with an ERA of 5.82 in just 130 innings for the Royals.

Colorado Rockies
On April 30, 2008, he was sent to the Colorado Rockies, completing the earlier trade that sent pitcher Ramón Ramírez to the Royals. In his first season with the Rockies, De la Rosa won 10 games for the first time in his career. He also lowered his ERA by a full run over the previous two seasons.

De la Rosa struggled during the first half of the 2009 season, going 0–6 in his first 10 starts. However, after June 1, de la Rosa was one of the best pitchers in baseball. De la Rosa won 16 games for the Rockies that year, and he helped the Rockies clinch the NL wild card with his second-half performance. On October 4 while pitching against the Los Angeles Dodgers, de la Rosa suffered a strained left groin and left the game. De la Rosa would go on to miss the NLDS against the Phillies. De la Rosa had the best season of his career in 2009, going 16–9 with a 4.38 ERA, and 193 strikeouts. De la Rosa's 16 wins ranked him third in the NL in 2009.

De la Rosa started the 2010 season going 3–1, 3.91 ERA, 26 K in 23 innings pitched before suffering a torn flexor tendon band in his left finger which put de la Rosa on the disabled list for the next 2 months. He returned in July from the DL and finished the season going 8–7, 4.22 ERA, and 113 K in 121.2 innings pitched.

De la Rosa became a free agent at the end of the 2010 season. He signed a two-year contract with a player option for a third year to remain with the Rockies.

On May 24, 2011, de la Rosa suffered a complete tear of the ulnar collateral ligament in his left elbow, requiring Tommy John ligament transfer surgery, thus the end of his season. He had posted a record of 4–0 in April, and had a 1–2 May, before the injury.

After missing almost the whole 2012 season, De la Rosa made his return toward the end of the season, making three starts for the Rockies.

After three injury-plagued seasons, De la Rosa's 2013 season marked the best season of his career despite lowering his K/9. He finished tied for a career high in wins with 16 and a career low ERA of 3.49 in 30 starts.

In 2014, De la Rosa took a step back from his previous season. He finished 14–11 with an ERA of 4.10 and a career high 21 home runs allowed. After the season, De la Rosa and the Rockies agreed to a two-year contract extension.

On June 14, 2015, De la Rosa became the Rockies all-time wins leader, notching win number 73 for the franchise. Despite just winning 9 games in 2015 due to injury, De la Rosa set franchise records with the most wins by a Rockie and most K's in franchise history.

De la Rosa's .618 winning percentage is a Rockies' franchise record (50 start minimum). De la Rosa also holds the Rockies all-time record for best winning percentage in Coors Field with a .763 winning percentage.

Arizona Diamondbacks
On February 19, 2017, he signed a minor league contract with the Arizona Diamondbacks. He was added to the 40 man roster at the end of spring training and began the season as a reliever. De la Rosa pitched the whole season out of the bullpen for the first time since 2005. He went 3-1 with a 4.21 ERA in 65 games.

On February 16, 2018, de la Rosa signed a new minor league contract with the Diamondbacks.

On July 31, 2018, de la Rosa was designated for assignment. He was released on August 4, 2018.

Chicago Cubs
On August 10, 2018, de la Rosa signed a Major League contract with the Chicago Cubs. He became a free agent after the season.

Second stint with Colorado
On April 5, 2019, de la Rosa signed a new minor league contract with the Rockies. He was released on June 7, 2019, without appearing in any games due to an oblique injury.

International career
De la Rosa played for the Mexican team during the 2006 World Baseball Classic.

See also

 List of Colorado Rockies team records

References

External links

1981 births
Living people
Arizona Diamondbacks players
Arizona League Diamondbacks players
Baseball players from Nuevo León
Chicago Cubs players
Colorado Rockies players
Colorado Springs Sky Sox players
Grand Junction Rockies players
High Desert Mavericks players
Huntsville Stars players
Indianapolis Indians players
Kansas City Royals players
Major League Baseball pitchers
Major League Baseball players from Mexico
Mexican expatriate baseball players in the United States
Mexican League baseball pitchers
Milwaukee Brewers players
Missoula Osprey players
Modesto Nuts players
Naranjeros de Hermosillo players
Omaha Royals players
Pawtucket Red Sox players
Portland Sea Dogs players
Sarasota Red Sox players
Sportspeople from Monterrey
Sultanes de Monterrey players
Trenton Thunder players
Tulsa Drillers players
Wichita Wranglers players
2006 World Baseball Classic players